Skip (est. in 2017) was a San Francisco-based company which provided a scooter-sharing system in several American cities. The company was founded by Matt Tran, Mike Wadhera, and Sanjay Dastoor during Y Combinator's winter 2018 class. Skip differentiated itself from competitors by making sturdier scooters with larger batteries, offering instructional classes, and working with cities before rolling out. It was acquired by Hertz in 2020 and filed for Chapter 7 bankruptcy in August 2021.

History 

Skip was founded as Waybots in winter 2017 by the creators of Boosted Board, as higher-end competitor to other scooter-sharing systems.

In May 2018, Skip raised a $6M seed round of funding. In June 2018, the company raised an additional $25M in its Series A round.

In December, 2020, Skip was acquired by competitor Helbiz.

Areas served 
In February 2018, then Waybots launched in its first city, Washington, D.C., as part of a pilot program.

At the end of August 2018, the city of San Francisco gave Skip and Scoot permission to operate dockless scooters in the city. In an email sent out October 15, 2019 to its members, Skip announced that their scooters "will no longer be rentable as part of SFMTA’s Powered Scooter Share Program for 2019-2020" effective immediately. Skip has reportedly requested an appeal of SFMTA's decision, in order to continue operations in San Francisco.

Between June and July 2019, Skip launched in San Diego, CA and Austin, TX. 

The company filed for Chapter 7 bankruptcy (dissolution) in 2021.

References 

Scooter sharing companies
Y Combinator companies
Companies based in San Francisco
American companies established in 2017
Transportation in San Diego
Transportation in Austin, Texas
Transportation in San Francisco
Transportation in Washington, D.C.
2017 establishments in California
Kick scooters